G&T can mean:

 Gin and tonic
 Geometry & Topology — a peer-refereed, international mathematics research journal.
 Geometry and trigonometry
 the Gifted And Talented
 a Gifted And Talented program
 Generation & Transmission cooperative (wholesale energy provider)
 Gramophone & Typewriter Ltd
 G&T Crampton, an Irish construction company